Hellurnar is a village in the Faroe Islands, on Oyndarfjørður (fjord), located on the east side of Eysturoy.

Hellurnar is part of the municipality of Fuglafjørður.

History
Hellurnar was founded in 1849 by people from Lamba.

See also
 List of towns in the Faroe Islands

External links
Faroeislands.dk: Hellur Images and description of all cities on the Faroe Islands.

Populated places in the Faroe Islands
Populated places established in 1849
1849 establishments in the Faroe Islands